Holy Family with a Shepherd is a c. 1510 painting by Titian, now in the National Gallery, London. It has also previously been attributed to Antony van DycK, who produced a drawing copying it. After passing through other private collections, it was bequeathed to the National Gallery by William Holwell Carr in 1831.

Bibliography
Francesco Valcanover, L'opera completa di Tiziano, Rizzoli, Milano 1969.

References 

Paintings of the Madonna and Child by Titian
1510 paintings
Paintings by Titian in the National Gallery, London
Titian